Xylophanes virescens is a moth of the  family Sphingidae. It is known from Colombia.

References

virescens
Endemic fauna of Colombia
Moths of South America
Moths described in 1875